The Hunter Valley Steamfest is one of the major events in the New South Wales steam locomotive season and also one of the major events held in Maitland, in the Hunter Region. Held over two days in April, it is usually attended by steam locomotives from the Canberra Railway Museum, NSW Rail Museum and Powerhouse Museum and railmotors from the Rail Motor Society.

History

The first Hunter Valley Steamfest was held in April 1986 to commemorate the days of steam, three years after steam operations on the South Maitland Railway ceased. In 2017, Steamfest attracted 50,000 visitors.

The 2020 and 2021 events were cancelled due to the COVID-19 pandemic, while the 2022 event was cancelled due to flooding at Maitland.

Locomotives
Hunter Valley Steamfest has seen different locomotives from over six different preservation organisations within New South Wales and even one from the United Kingdom.

This list contains the locomotives that have attended the Hunter Valley Steamfest:

Local area of Maitland
SMR 10: Steam Display item at South Maitland Rail Yard 1990–95, 2006–07 and Steam trip in 2007
SMR 17: Steam Display item at South Maitland Rail Yard 1991
SMR 18: Steam Display item at South Maitland Rail Yard 1991–93, 2007 and Steam trip in 1994–95, 2007
SMR 25: Display in Maitland railway Yards in 1986 before being moved to Richmond Vale Railway
SMR 27: Static Display 1987

Richmond Vale Railway
Marjorie: 1986–2015
SMR 24: 1990–93, 1995–97
SMR 25: 1991–96, 1998–99
SMR 30: 2000, 2003, 2005–09

Ex New South Wales Government Railways
3001: NSW Rail Museum - 1986, 1988
3016: Canberra Railway Museum - 2013, 2016, NSW Rail Museum - 2017
3112: Barry Tulloch - 1988–89, 1992, 1994–96, 2002–07
3237: Lachlan Valley Railway - 2009, 2015
3265: Powerhouse Museum - 2010–14, 2019
3526: NSW Rail Museum - 2007–12, 2019
3642: NSW Rail Museum - 1986–87, 1990–92, 2008–18
3801: 3801 Limited - 1987, 1989–98, 2000–2006, NSW Rail Museum - 2007 2023
3830: Powerhouse Museum - 1998–2009
5910: NSW Rail Museum - 1986–88
5917: Private Owner - 1986, 2009, 2014, 2016 2023
6029: Canberra Railway Museum - 2016, Private Owner - 2018, NSW Rail Museum 2023
 R766: Private owner 2023

--> 
United Kingdom
LNER 4472 Flying Scotsman - 1989

Excursions
During the Steamfest, trips to Broadmeadow, Branxton, Singleton, Paterson and Dungog are operated by both steam and preserved rail motor. The Sunday Barrington Bullet travels to Dungog, then to Stroud Road loop and return. In 2015, a new trip to Port Waratah was introduced.

In the early years of the festival, steam hauled charters brought passengers to the event but this is no longer the case with the locomotives and rolling stock moving to the festival empty. In 1986 two trips from Sydney Central and another from Blacktown operated. In 2013 and 2014 passengers were able to travel on the stock movement from Picton to Maitland, albeit on the Friday before and Monday after the festival.

The Great Race

One of the excursions involves a race between one or more steam locomotives and one or more de Havilland Tiger Moth. In 2010 a triple parallel of 3265, 3642 and 3526 was organised taking months of planning. The locomotives raced against three Tiger Moths and winner of the race was the oldest locomotive in the race, 3265. A Tiger Moth eventually won the race for the first time in 2012. In 2016, the race was between four trains and four Tiger Moths.

Related events
In 2004, Hunter Valley Steamfest received its own ground at the intersection of Church Street and the New England Highway adjacent to Maitland station. The ground is called Maitland Steamfest Rally Ground and is managed by Maitland Steam and Antique Machinery Association. Steam traction engines and portable steam appliances are stored, maintained and refurbished by volunteers onsite.   Traction engines are also run onsite and driven on local roads in the Maitland area. Events and displays provided by the association include traction engines, portable steam appliances and equipment, road steam equipment, mini train rides (provided by the Lake Macquarie Live Steam group), vintage machinery, interpretive tours and static displays. Maitland Steam and Antique Machinery Association also provide event management and catering at Hunter Valley Steamfest and other events hosted at the Maitland Steamfest Rally Ground including Maitland Motor Heritage and Steam Fair and the Annual Postie Bike Rally.

Maitland Park plays host for the "Show 'n Shine car expo" where hundreds of vintage, veteran and classic cars are on display. The car expo is held on the Sunday during Steamfest.

As part of Steamfest, the Richmond Vale Railway Museum south of Kurri Kurri is open to the public with tours provided on the museum's own operational steam locomotive and with other steam related machines on site.

References

External links

Festivals established in 1986
Festivals in New South Wales
Maitland, New South Wales
Rail transport in the Hunter Region
1986 establishments in Australia